Kristin McGee (born August 31, 1973) is an American fitness instructor and yogi who launched Peloton Interactive yoga classes. She is a mom of three boys and a fitness influencer who advocates for the benefits of movement.

Early life 
McGee was born in Pocatello, Idaho and attended Irving Junior High and Pocatello High School. McGee studied dance stating at a young age, and was a cheerleader and played tennis in high school. 

McGee moved to New York City to study theater at New York University's Tisch School of the Arts. While she worked to land acting roles, McGee became a certified yoga and Pilates instructor.

Career 

After college graduation in 1997, McGee lived in New York and taught yoga and Pilates to famous actors including Leann Rimes, Steve Martin, Tina Fey, Emilia Clarke, and Savanah Guthrie.

McGee worked as the choreographer and host of MTV's Pilates and yoga DVDs in the early 2000s, and has appeared on the Today Show and Good Morning America. McGee also produced her own DVD series, which includes Kristin McGee’s Power Yoga and Kristin McGee’s Bendigirl Yoga.

From 2009 to 2010, McGee had a recurring role on the TV show 30 Rock where she married Jason Sudeikis.

McGee joined Peloton Interactive in 2018 and was one of the three instructors that launched the yoga class category.

References 

1973 births
Living people
American exercise instructors
Peloton instructors
New York University alumni
People from Pocatello, Idaho